Han Min-goo (born 30 August 1953), is a former South Korean Minister of Defense. He is a former South Korean army general who served as the 40th Chief of Staff of the South Korean army as well as the 36th Chairman of the Joint Chiefs of Staff of the South Korean military.

Career
Han served his compulsory military service in the ROK Naval Submarine branch. He later graduated from Officer Academy in the Armour Branch and later transferred to Army Aviation as a UH-1 Cobra pilot.  Han's assignments prior to assuming Army Chief of Staff were Chief of Strategic Planning, ROK Army Headquarters; Commanding General, 53rd Infantry Division; Commanding General, Capital Defense Command; Deputy Chief of Staff of the Republic of Korea Army.

Education
 Graduated, Cheongju High School
 Bachelor of Science, Korea Military Academy (31st Graduating Class)
 Bachelor of Arts in History, Seoul National University
 Master of Arts in Foreign Affairs and National Security, Yonsei University

References

External links

 Minister Profile at Republic of Korea Ministry of National Defense

Living people
1953 births
Korea Military Academy alumni
South Korean generals
Chiefs of Staff of the Army (South Korea)
Chairmen of the Joint Chiefs of Staff (South Korea)
National Defense ministers of South Korea